The Pro Football Hall of Fame includes players, coaches, and contributors (e.g., owners, general managers and team or league officials) who have "made outstanding contributions to professional football". The charter class of seventeen was selected in 1963.

Enshrinees are selected by a 48-person selection committee which meets each year at the time and location of the Super Bowl. Current rules of the committee stipulate that between four and eight individuals are selected each year. Any person may nominate an individual to the hall, provided the nominee has been retired for at least five years. Not including the charter class, 76 players have been inducted in their first year of eligibility.

In addition to the regular selection committee, which primarily focuses on contributions made over the past approximately thirty seasons, a nine-member seniors committee (which is a subset of the larger committee) submits two nominees each year whose contributions came prior to 1985. These nominees are referred as "seniors nominees" (formerly "old-timer" nominees).

In 2020, a special Blue-Ribbon Panel selected an additional 15 new members, known as the "Centennial Slate", to be inducted into the Hall of Fame to celebrate the 100th anniversary of the National Football League (NFL).

Inductees 
On February 10, 2022, Tony Boselli was selected to the Hall of Fame, making the Jacksonville Jaguars (began play in 1995) the last team to have an enshrinee inducted. The teams which most recently gained representation are the Carolina Panthers (Reggie White, class of 2006) and the Houston Texans (Ed Reed, class of 2019). Ray Guy was the first full-time punter inducted (class of 2014).

The hall is not officially affiliated with the National Football League (NFL), although, as of 2022, all but one enshrinee participated in the NFL for at least a portion of his career; the single exception being Billy Shaw. Along with Shaw, there are 37 other inductees into the hall who spent all or part of their careers in the American Football League that merged with the NFL. Shaw was the only player not to make the formal transition to the NFL, as he had retired the year before the merger. Three players, Red Grange, Ray Flaherty, Mike Michalske, played a portion of their career in the first American Football League from 1926. The second American Football League from 1936 only has one Hall of Fame member who has played in this league, Ken Strong; Strong is also one of two Hall of Famers (the other being Sid Luckman) to play in the American Association. Fifteen inductees spent some of their playing career in the All-America Football Conference during the late 1940s. Five players played some at least one year in the Ohio League, the predecessor to the NFL. Six players or coaches who spent part of their careers in the short-lived United States Football League (USFL) have been inducted. Two coaches (Marv Levy, Bud Grant), one administrator (Jim Finks), and five players (Warren Moon, Fred Biletnikoff, John Henry Johnson, Don Maynard, Arnie Weinmeister) who spent part of their careers in the Canadian Football League (CFL) have been inducted; three of which have been or are scheduled to be inducted into the Canadian Football Hall of Fame: Marv Levy, Warren Moon and Bud Grant.  Four players, Larry Csonka, Leroy Kelly, Don Maynard, and Paul Warfield, played a portion of their career in the short-lived World Football League. Fritz Pollard is the only player to play in the Anthracite League's only season. One player (Kurt Warner) and one owner (Pat Bowlen) made significant contributions in the Arena Football League; Warner and Art McNally are also the only NFL Europe/World League alumni in the Hall. Terrell Owens played one season of professional football in the Indoor Football League and, after his induction, is playing in Fan Controlled Football. Bill Walsh and Ken Stabler each had one season of experience in the Continental Football League.

Each entry includes the year of induction (i.e., "class"), position(s) played, team(s) each was associated with, and tenures with each team. As some inductees were both players and coaches, the position indicated here is the position indicated on the Hall of Fame website. The Pro Football Hall of Fame website does not include CFL, USFL, WFL, indoor football leagues, and other lesser known league teams. The Canadian Football League and the Arena Football League both have their own halls of fame. NFL, American Football League, All-America Football Conference, and Ohio League (listed as pre-NFL) teams are recognized in the Hall of Fame. The list is complete through the Class of 2022.

Sorting tips:
Sorting by position will line up players by the year they were inducted
Sorting by position also groups all similar positions together
Running backs, halfbacks, fullbacks are grouped together
Linebackers, middle linebackers, outside linebackers are grouped together
Ends and flankers are grouped with wide receivers
General managers and team administrators are grouped together
Sorting by teams groups all names of a franchise together, i.e., all Cardinal teams listed under Arizona Cardinals
When sorting, a person has a row for every team he has been with

Notes:
 Selected in first year of eligibility
 Charter member
 Senior nominee
 Heisman Trophy Winner
 As head coach of the Akron Pros in 1921, Fritz Pollard became the first African American coach in NFL history.

Inductees who have played for non-NFL teams 
Through 2021, Billy Shaw is the only player in the Hall of Fame who has never played in the NFL; he played the entirety of his career with the Buffalo Bills in the AFL. While the hall recognizes NFL teams which had previously been in the AFL, AAFC, or been independent/Ohio League, other professional football league's franchises are not considered primary teams to the individuals who have contributed to them. Here is a list of individuals who have contributed to other professional leagues at some point in their career. As of 2022, four players have contributed to AFL I, one to AFL II, one to AFL III, three to the American Association, three to the Arena Football League, one to the Indoor Football League, eleven to the Canadian Football League, four to the World Football League, seven to the United States Football League, two to the Continental Football League, two for NFL Europe, one for the 1960s United Football League, one for Western Pennsylvania Professional Football Circuit, and eleven played for independent teams (several of which played in the NFL at some point). The Ohio League had five individuals contribute, the All-America Football Conference had fifteen, and the American Football League which merged with the NFL had thirty-nine Hall of Famers play for the league. Bill Polian founded the Alliance of American Football, but he was inducted into the hall in 2015 and the league started in 2019. As previously stated, for CFL stars, there is a corresponding Canadian Football Hall of Fame; only one player, Warren Moon, and two coaches, Bud Grant and Marv Levy, are enshrined in both halls. Again for the Arena Football League, there is also a corresponding Arena Football Hall of Fame; similarly, one player, Kurt Warner, has been enshrined into both halls. The Indoor Football League has also established a Hall of Fame, of which Terrell Owens played one season, thus no players have been inducted into both halls. Owens has also played in the Fan Controlled Football since 2022, five years after his enshrinement into the Hall.

(Note that this list only includes contributors in the same field for which they were inducted; thus, though Doak Walker and Steve Van Buren were inducted to the Hall of Fame as players, their coaching work in the Continental Football League is not counted here.)

"*" indicates that a team had at one point in their existence participated in the NFL.

The following are current and defunct professional football leagues which as of 2020 have had no Pro Football Hall of Fame Inductees play for:
 New York Pro Football League—Leo Lyons has been nominated several times but never inducted
 XFL, nor its short lived predecessor
 Liga de Fútbol Americano Profesional
 United Football League (2009–2012)
 Alliance of American Football (Although the league was founded by Bill Polian, he was inducted in 2015 and the league only lasted in 2019)
 Legends Football League
 American Arena League
 American West Football Conference
 Champions Indoor Football
 National Arena League

References

External links 
 
 

List
National Football League lists